Divan Venter is a South African rugby union player for the  in the Currie Cup. His regular position is flanker.

He made his debut in the same fixture, coming on as a replacement flanker.

References

South African rugby union players
Living people
Rugby union flankers
Blue Bulls players
Year of birth missing (living people)